Oskars Batņa (born 7 May 1995) is a Latvian professional ice hockey forward who is currently a playing for Mikkelin Jukurit of the Finnish Liiga.

Playing career
As a junior, Batņa played in Latvian junior leagues. In the 2013 season, he joined Dinamo Riga junior club HK Rīga of MHL He made his KHL debut on 22 August 2017 in a loss against Avangard Omsk, he scored his first KHL goal in win against Jokerit on 26 January 2018.

Career statistics

Regular season and playoffs

International

References

External links

1995 births
Living people
Anglet Hormadi Élite players
Dinamo Riga players
Latvian ice hockey centres
Mikkelin Jukurit players
HK Riga players
Ice hockey people from Riga
Ice hockey players at the 2022 Winter Olympics
Olympic ice hockey players of Latvia